The men's 1500 metres event at the 1967 European Indoor Games was held on 11 March in Prague.

Results

References

1500 metres at the European Athletics Indoor Championships
1500